Montague Township may refer to the following townships:

 Montague, Ontario, Canada
 Montague Township, Michigan, United States
 Montague Township, New Jersey, United States

See also
Montague (disambiguation)

Township name disambiguation pages